Åsa Beckman (born 1961) is a Swedish literary critic. She writes for the Swedish newspaper Dagens Nyheter and was editor of the literary magazine Bonniers Litterära Magasin from 1987 to 1990.

Works 
 Jag själv ett hus av ljus, Albert Bonniers förlag 2002

Awards 
 Gerard Bonniers essäpris (essay award), 2003

References

Swedish literary critics
Swedish women literary critics
Living people
1961 births
Swedish women writers